The 2021 Nicky Rackard Cup was the 17th staging of the Nicky Rackard Cup since its establishment by the Gaelic Athletic Association in 2005. The cup began on 26 June 2021 and ended on 31 July 2021.

Longford and Monaghan did not participate in the competition after being relegated in 2020. Donegal were the defending champions, however, they were beaten by Tyrone in the semi-final. Leitrim were relegated after a defeat by Armagh.

The final was played on 31 July 2021 at Croke Park in Dublin, between Mayo and Tyrone, in what was their first ever meeting in a final. Mayo won the match by 2-27 to 1-14 to claim their second cup title overall and a first title since 2016.

Donegal's Declan Coulter was the Nicky Rackard Cup's top scorer with 1-34.

Team changes

To Championship 
Relegated from the Christy Ring Cup

 None

Promoted from the Lory Meagher Cup

 None

From Championship 
Promoted to the Christy Ring Cup

 None

Relegated to the Lory Meagher Cup

 Longford
 Monaghan

Competition Format

Cup format 

The format has been changed for 2021 with 5 teams playing across two groups, one with 3 teams and one with 2 teams based on an open draw.

Group A will feature 3 teams and be played in a single Round Robin format with each team having one home game and one away game.

Group B will feature 2 teams who will play a single fixture.

All teams will play a knockout format after this group stage, with the group winners and second-placed team in Group A being placed in the semi-finals. A tie between the third-placed team in Group A and second-placed team in Group B will determine the fourth semi-finalist.

Promotion 
The winner of the final will be promoted to the Christy Ring Cup.

Relegation 
The loser of the quarter-final will be relegated to the Lory Meagher Cup

Group stage

Group A 

{| class="wikitable" style="text-align:center"
!width=20|
!width=150 style="text-align:left;"|Team
!width=20|
!width=20|
!width=20|
!width=20|
!width=50|
!width=50|
!width=20|
!width=20|
!Qualification
|- style="background:#ccffcc"
|1||align=left| Mayo||2||2||0||0||2-43||0-26||+23||4
| rowspan="2" |Advance to Semi-Finals
|- style="background:#ccffcc"
|2|| align="left" | Donegal||2||1||0||1||1-47||6-24||+5||2
|- style="background:#FFFFE0"
|3|| align="left" | Leitrim||2||0||0||2||4-19||1-56||-28||0
|Advance to Quarter-Finals
|}

Group A round 1

Group A round 2

Group A round 3

Group B 

{| class="wikitable" style="text-align:center"
!width=20|
!width=150 style="text-align:left;"|Team
!width=20|
!width=20|
!width=20|
!width=20|
!width=50|
!width=50|
!width=20|
!width=20|
!Qualification
|- style="background:#ccffcc"
|1||align=left| Tyrone||1||1||0||0||1-18||1-16||+2||2
|Advance to Semi-Finals
|- style="background:#FFFFE0"
|2|| align="left" | Armagh||1||0||0||1||1-16||1-18||-2||0
|Advance to Quarter-Finals
|}

Group B round 1

Knockout stage

Bracket

Quarter-final

Semi-finals

Final

Statistics

Top scorers

Top scorer overall

In a single game

References 

Nicky Rackard Cup